Don Braden (born November 20, 1963) is an American jazz tenor saxophonist.

Career
Braden was born in Cincinnati, Ohio and raised in Louisville, Kentucky. He began playing tenor sax at age 13 and started playing professionally at 15. In high school, he played in the McDonald's All-American High School Jazz Band. He attended Harvard University from 1981 to 1984, studied engineering, and played in the school's jazz ensemble. He moved to New York City in 1984, where he played with The Harper Brothers, Lonnie Smith, and Betty Carter. In 1986–87 he toured with Wynton Marsalis, and following this played with Out of the Blue, Roy Haynes, Tony Williams, Freddie Hubbard, J.J. Johnson, Tom Harrell, Art Farmer, and the Mingus Big Band.

Discography

As leader
 The Time Is Now (Criss Cross, 1991)
 Wish List (Criss Cross, 1991)
 After Dark (Criss Cross, 1993)
 Landing Zone (Landmark, 1994)
 Organic (Epicure, 1995)
 The Open Road (Double-Time, 1996)
 The Voice of the Saxophone (RCA, 1997)
 The Fire Within (RCA, 1999)
 Contemporary Standards Ensemble (Double-Time, 2000)
 Brighter Days (HighNote, 2001)
 The New Hang (HighNote, 2004)
 Workin' - Live at Cecil's (HighNote, 2006)
 Gentle Storm (HighNote, 2008)
 The Strayhorn Project (with Mark Rapp) (Premium Music Solutions, 2009)
 Big Fun(k) Live (with Karl Latham) (Creative Perspective Music, 2011)
 Come Together (with Julie Michels) (Creative Perspective Music/JHP, 2012)
 Full Circle (with Vanessa Rubin) (Creative Perspective Music, 2013)
 Luminosity (Creative Perspective Music, 2015)
 Earth Wind and Wonder (Creative Perspective Music, 2018)

As sideman
With Art Farmer
Silk Road (Arabesque, 1997)
With Freddie Hubbard
 At Jazz Jamboree Warszawa '91: A Tribute to Miles (Starburst, 2000)
With Jimmy Ponder
 Guitar Christmas (HighNote, 1998)
With Roseanna Vitro
 Tropical Postcards (A Records, 2004)

References

Scott Yanow, [ Don Braden] at Allmusic

External links
 
 

American jazz saxophonists
American male saxophonists
Musicians from Cincinnati
1963 births
Harvard University alumni
Living people
Musicians from Louisville, Kentucky
Jazz musicians from Kentucky
21st-century American saxophonists
Jazz musicians from Ohio
21st-century American male musicians
American male jazz musicians
Criss Cross Jazz artists
HighNote Records artists
RCA Records artists
Double-Time Records artists
Landmark Records artists